The Voice may refer to:

Fictional entities
 The Voice or Presence, a fictional representation of God in DC Comics 
 The Voice (Dune), a fictional ability in the Dune universe
 The Voice, a character in the American TV series Cleopatra 2525

Film  
 The Voice (1920 film), a German silent drama film
 "The Voice" (Australian Playhouse), an Australian television play
 The Voice (1982 film), a Soviet psychological drama film
 The Voice (1992 film), a French drama film
 The Voice (2010 film), a Turkish horror film
 The Voice, a 2005 film directed by Johan Söderberg

Publications

Books and stories
 "The Voice", a story featuring The Shadow, a fictional vigilante
 The Voice (Bible translation), a 2011–2012 translation of the Christian Bible published by Thomas Nelson
 The Voice (novel), by Gabriel Okara, 1964
 The Voice (poetry collection), by Thomas Hardy, 1912

Newspapers and magazines

 The Voice, the newspaper published by Winnipeg Labour Party, Canada
 The Voice (Adelaide newspaper), an Australian newspaper, published 1892–1894
 The Voice (Botswana), a print and online newspaper
 The Voice (British newspaper), an Afro-Caribbean weekly newspaper
 The Voice (Tasmanian newspaper), a weekly Australian newspaper published 1951–1953 (formerly People's Voice)
 The Voice Magazine, a student publication of Athabasca University, Canada
 The Voice of Saint Lucia, a newspaper published in Saint Lucia, Caribbean
 The Voice Weekly, a former news journal in Burmese language

Music

Albums and EPs  
 The Voice (Bobby McFerrin album), 1984 
 The Voice (Kokia album), 2008
 The Voice (Mavis Staples album), 1993
 The Voice (Mike Jones album), 2009
 The Voice (Russell Watson album), 2000
 The Voice (SG Wannabe EP), 2015
 The Voice (Vicious Rumors EP), 1994
 The Voice (Vusi Mahlasela album), 2003
 The Voice (Lil Durk album), 2020
 The Voice, an album by David Phelps, 2008
 The Voice: Frank Sinatra, the Columbia Years (1943–1952), 1986
 The Voice of Frank Sinatra, 1946
The Voice (Jay Perez album), 1995

Songs  
 "The Voice" (The Moody Blues song), 1981
 "The Voice" (Ultravox song), 1981
 "The Voice" (Eimear Quinn song), winner of the 1996 Eurovision Song Contest
 "The Voice", a song by The Alan Parsons Project on their album I Robot

People known as "The Voice"  

 Jay Black (1938-2021), an American singer
 Russ Bray (born 1957), a British darts referee
 Lil Durk (born 1992), an American rapper
 Vern Gosdin (1934–2009), an American singer
 Whitney Houston (1963–2012), an American singer
 Roger Huston (born 1942), an American harness race announcer
 Sandi Patty (born 1956), an American singer
 Steve Perry (born 1949), an American singer
 Lenny Zakatek (born 1947), a British singer

Television and radio

Television shows
 The Voice (franchise), an international reality television singing competition
The Voice (franchise) § The Voice around the world includes a list of local titles in the franchise
 The Voice (Hong Kong TV series), a singing competition (not part of The Voice franchise)
 "The Voice" (Seinfeld), a 1997 episode of the NBC sitcom
 "The Voice" (The Amazing World of Gumball), an episode of the TV series
 "The Voice", episodes of Dynasty (1981 TV series)

Television channels 
 The Voice TV, a network of music television channels owned by ProSiebenSat.1 Media
 The Voice (Bulgaria)
 The Voice TV Denmark, now 7'eren
 The Voice TV Finland, now Kutonen
 The Voice TV Norway
 The Voice TV Sweden

Radio stations
 The Voice (radio station), a radio station in Denmark, Sweden and Bulgaria
 The Voice (North Devon), a British radio station
 The Voice of Hiphop & RnB, a Swedish radio station
 The Voice Hiphop & RnB Norway, a Norwegian radio station
 The Voice (CHOP), a radio station at Children's Hospital of Philadelphia, U.S.

Other uses
 The Voice, abbreviation for the Indigenous Voice to Parliament, a proposed body to advise the Australian Government 
 The vOICe, a sensory substitution system

See also 

 Voice (disambiguation)
 Voices (disambiguation)
 Voicing (disambiguation)
 La Voix (disambiguation)
 La Voz (disambiguation)
 "You're the Voice", 1986 hit single sung by John Farnham